Recreation Park and Rangpur Zoo, is located in Rangpur, Bangladesh, is the largest zoo in North Bengal and the second largest in Bangladesh in terms of size.

Rangpur Central Zoo is one of the recreation spots in Rangpur city.

History
It was established in 1989, and two years later on June 14, 1991, it was opened to exhibit 23 species of animals.

Attractions
As of 2018, The zoo has 215 individual animals of 26 species, include Mammal, Aves and Reptilians. Many wild animals are available to attract the visitors. A few of them including 2 lions, 1 Bengal tiger, 1 hippopotamus, 2 crocodiles, 2 oysters, 3 peacocks, 1 bear, 1 keshowari, 1 horse, and 1 colobinae. There are different kinds of birds, including cassowary, vulture, turkey, parrots, peacocks, herons and so on.

There are also a park, a lake, restaurants, and different kinds of local plants.

Bangladesh University of Engineering and Technology (BUET) had completed a digital survey and feasibility study of "Dhaka And Rangpur Zoo Modernization Project" to upgrade the facilities to international standard.

See also
 List of zoos in Bangladesh

References

External links

1989 establishments in Bangladesh
Zoos established in 1989
Zoos in Bangladesh
Rangpur, Bangladesh